Nikolas Maes (born 9 April 1986) is a Belgian former professional road bicycle racer, who competed professionally between 2007 and 2020, for the ,  and  teams. He now works as a directeur sportif for his final professional team, UCI WorldTeam .

Career 
Born in Kortrijk, Maes gained the first professional win of his career on the third stage of the Vuelta a Burgos around the province's capital city on 7 August 2009 while riding for the  cycle team.

On 9 September 2009 it was announced he would be joining  for the 2010 season. However, his name was not on the team roster presented on 5 October 2009.

Major results 

2004
 3rd Time trial, National Junior Road Championships
2006
 1st Circuit de Wallonie
 3rd Kattekoers
 3rd Druivenkoers Overijse
 5th La Côte Picarde
 6th Internationale Wielertrofee Jong Maar Moedig
 7th Overall Tour de Berlin
 8th Ronde van Vlaanderen Belefton
 8th Sparkassen Giro Bochum
 9th Internatie Reningelst
2007
 3rd Druivenkoers Overijse
 6th De Vlaamse Pijl
 9th Ronde van het Groene Hart
2008
 9th Overall Tour of Ireland
2009
 1st Stage 3 Vuelta a Burgos
2010
 5th Dutch Food Valley Classic
2011
 1st  Young rider classification Tour of Qatar
 10th Overall Tour de Wallonie
2012
 1st Stage 2b (TTT) Tour de l'Ain
2013
 1st  Overall World Ports Classic
1st  Points classification
 6th Dwars door Vlaanderen
 7th Vattenfall Cyclassics
 8th Brussels Cycling Classic
2014
 4th Halle–Ingooigem
 7th Overall Tour de Picardie
 8th Kuurne–Brussels–Kuurne
2015
 5th Rund um Köln
 9th Dwars door Vlaanderen
 10th Nokere Koerse
2016
 4th Halle–Ingooigem
2018
 6th Dwars door het Hageland

References

External links 

 

Belgian male cyclists
Living people
1986 births
Sportspeople from Kortrijk
Cyclists from West Flanders